The Scortas' Sun is a  novel by the French writer Laurent Gaudé. It is also known as The House of Scorta. It received the Prix Goncourt.

See also
 2004 in literature
 Contemporary French literature

References

2004 French novels
French-language novels
Prix Goncourt winning works
Actes Sud books